The Rugby competition at the 2010 Central American and Caribbean Games was a two-day tournament featuring eight national sevens teams representing countries in that region.

Although the Games were being hosted by Mayagüez, Puerto Rico, the sevens tournament was held in Guyana at Providence Stadium in Providence. All pool matches were held on 24 July. The second day on 25 July featured all eight teams playing in quarterfinals, with the winners advancing to the medal round and the losers entering a "Plate" consolation bracket. Both the medal round and Plate were knockout tournaments with a consolation match for the semifinal losers.

Pool stages

Pool A
{| class="wikitable" style="text-align: center;"
|-
!width="200"|Team
!width="40"|Pld
!width="40"|W
!width="40"|D
!width="40"|L
!width="40"|PF
!width="40"|PA
!width="40"|+/-
!width="40"|Pts
|- 
|align=left| 
| 3 || 3 || 0 || 0 || 113 || 7 || +106 || 9
|- 
|align=left| 
| 3 || 2 || 0 || 1 || 48 || 38 || +10 || 7
|- 
|align=left| 
| 3 || 1 || 0 || 2 || 26 || 67 || −41 || 5
|- 
|align=left| 
| 3 || 0 || 0 || 3 || 24 || 99 || −75 || 3
|}

Pool B
{| class="wikitable" style="text-align: center;"
|-
!width="200"|Team
!width="40"|Pld
!width="40"|W
!width="40"|D
!width="40"|L
!width="40"|PF
!width="40"|PA
!width="40"|+/-
!width="40"|Pts
|-
|align=left| 
| 3 || 2 || 1 || 0 || 39 || 12 || +27 || 8
|-
|align=left| 
| 3 || 1 || 1 || 1 || 17 || 29 || −12 || 6
|-
|align=left| 
| 3 || 0 || 2 || 1 || 17 || 19 || −2 || 5
|-
|align=left| 
| 3 || 0 || 2 || 1 || 24 || 37 || −13 || 5
|}

Plate round (5–8th place)

Medal round

References

External links

Events at the 2010 Central American and Caribbean Games
Central American and Caribbean Games
Central American and Caribbean Games
2010 Central American and Caribbean Games
Rugby union in Guyana